Harpadon microchir is a species of lizardfish that lives mainly in the Indo-Pacific.

References
 

Synodontidae
Fish described in 1878
Taxa named by Albert Günther